B Tuning or B Standard Tuning is the standard tuning for a seven string guitar, where the strings are tuned B-E-A-D-G-B-E. B tuning can also be achieved on a six-string guitar, when the strings are tuned B-E-A-D-F♯-B, known then as Baritone Tuning. This tuning is popular among several different types of metal bands.

Some bands use a tuning known as "drop A tuning", where they drop the low B to A, so the tuning for a 7-string guitar is as follows A1-E2-A2-D3-G3-B3-E4. Also, for a 6-string guitar, drop A tuning is achieved by tuning all strings down a 4th with the lowest string tuned 1 additional step down as follows A1-E2-A2-D3-F#3-B3. This is a "drop 1" tuning in the key of B (i.e. tune the whole guitar down a perfect fourth from standard tuning, then tune the 6th string a whole step down).

Used by
 Aborted
 The Absence
 Aeon (7-string guitars)
 Aghora (7-string guitars) (on the album Aghora (album))
 Allegaeon (7-string guitars)
 All Shall Perish 
 Alterbeast
 Alter Bridge (some songs)
 Amaranthe (since Massive Addictive)
 Amenra
 Amon Amarth (on most albums)
 Amputated
 Anacrusis
 Anal Cunt
 ANTISMA
 Anathema
 Angel Vivaldi (7-string guitars)
 Animals as Leaders (On most of their first album, 7-string guitars)
 Arch Enemy (On their first three albums: Black Earth, Stigmata and Burning Bridges; and a few songs from their more recent albums)
 Arcturus
 Armagedda
 At the Gates
 Attack Attack! (on the album self-titled Album)
 Audioslave
 Augury
 Avatar (from Black Waltz onwards)
 Bal-Sagoth
 Battlelore
 Biomechanical  (7-string guitars on the album)Cannibalised
 Black Midi
 Black Label Society (on "13 Years of Grief" from the album Stronger than Death)
 Bloodbath
 Blood Has Been Shed
 Blood Red Throne (on the album Altered Genesis)
 Bongzilla
 Bring Me the Horizon (on their album Count Your Blessings)
 Brujeria
 Brutart
 Burial Invocation
 Cannibal Corpse (7-string guitars)
 Carpathian
 Carach Angren
 Cavalera Conspiracy (on the album Blunt Force Trauma and some songs on the album Inflikted)
 Carajo (B flat tuning)
 Carcass
 Cathedral (on the albums Forest of Equilibrium, The Ethereal Mirror, Statik Majik, and The Garden of Unearthly Delights)
 Celtic Frost (on "Monotheist" and live performances during 2000s)
 Cephalic Carnage
 Coal Chamber (BEADGB, although some songs used drop A)
 Coheed and Cambria (Key Entity Extraction II: Hollywood the Cracked, Key Entity Extraction V: Sentry the Defiant)
 Crowbar
 Cryptopsy
 Dave Matthews Band (On "You Never Know", “I Did It” and “The Space Between”)
 Decapitated (On the Blood Mantra album)
 Despised Icon
 The Devil Wears Prada
 Dismember
 Divine Heresy (7-string guitars)
 DragonForce (7-string guitars, except for the song "Three Hammers")
 Dream Theater (7-string guitars) (used on many songs, including "Lie", "Caught in a Web" and "The Mirror" from Awake; the 1994 version of "To Live Forever"; "A Change of Seasons"; "Just Let Me Breathe" from Falling into Infinity; "Scene Seven: I. The Dance of Eternity" from Metropolis Pt. 2: Scenes from a Memory, and most songs from the Twelve-step Suite)
 Drowning Pool
 Edenbridge (7-string guitars) (on some songs from their first five albums)
 Edge Of Sanity
 Éjfény
 Electric Wizard (on the album Dopethrone)
 Eluveitie (on many songs)
 Emperor on the album Prometheus: The Discipline of Fire & Demise
 Engulfed (7-string guitars)
 Entombed (on their album Left Hand Path)
 Epica (on The Divine Conspiracy and all subsequent albums)
 Eucharist
 Evanescence (on "Going Under")
 Exhumed 
 Fallujah (7-string guitars)
 Fear Factory (used B on a six-string prior to Dino Cazares' 1995 switch to Ibanez, from whom he began 7-string guitars.)
 Five Finger Death Punch
 Fleshgod Apocalypse
 Gemini Syndrome
 Godflesh (used on the Godflesh EP and the Streetcleaner, Us and Them, and Hymns LPs
 Grave 
 Graveworm
 Hail of Bullets
 Haken (7/8-string guitars)
 Halestorm (drop A, on the song "I Am the Fire")
 HIM (on many songs)
 Hunting Humans 
 Hypocrisy (along with drop A on all albums up from The Fourth Dimension until The Arrival, after which A# Standard and Drop G# are used)
 I Killed The Prom Queen
 Illdisposed (All albums up until Burn Me Wicked)
 Iron Monkey
 Iwrestledabearonce
 Jinjer (drop A, on their album King of Everything)
 Joe Bonamassa (on "The Ballad of John Henry")
 John Prine (on "The Late John Garfield Blues" and "Fish and Whistle" since 1998)
 Jungle Rot
 Kataklysm
 Kingdom of Sorrow
 King's X (along with drop A, on Please Come Home... Mr. Bulbous and most subsequent albums)
 Kenn Nardi
 Kreator (some songs on the album "Renewal")
 Krisiun 
 Kyuss (some songs on Wretch (album))
 Lacuna Coil (7-string guitars)
 Lead Belly was rumored to use this tuning in a 12-string variation.
 Leprous (7-string guitars)
 Linkin Park (BEADGB. Used on live performances of the songs "Runaway" and "With You" from 2003 onwards; originally recorded on standard tuned 7-string guitars)
 Machine Head
 Massacre (on Back from Beyond)
 Mnemic
 The Monolith Deathcult
 Motionless in White
 Mudvayne (on "Dig")
 Muse (on "Won't Stand Down" and "Kill or Be Killed")
 MyChildren MyBride
 Ne Obliviscaris (7-string guitars)
 Negură Bunget (7-string guitars)
 Nekrogoblikon  (7-string guitars) 
 Nickelback (some songs)
 Nile (drop A) 
 Novembre
 Oomph!
 Otto Mann
 Pain of Salvation (7-string guitars)
 Pelican
 Pomegranate Tiger (7-string guitars)
 Pro-Pain
 Profiles in Terror (7-string guitar and 6 guitar B tuned) 
 Raintime (7 string guitars)
 RED (drop A)
 Rose Funeral
 Satariel (7-string guitars)
 Scar Symmetry (7 string guitars, on Symmetric in Design and Pitch Black Progress; have since switched to Drop A tuning)
 Seventh Void
 Sepultura (from Roots onward)
 Seringai
 Skinless
 Shadow Over Innsmouth
 Slayer (some songs)
 Sleep (on their new single "Leagues Beneath")
 Slipknot (drop A, on some songs)
 Soilwork
 Soulfly
 Spawn of Possession (6- & 7-string guitars; Jonas Bryssling plays a 6 string, while Jonas Karlsson and Christian Muenzner's parts are written for 7 strings)
 Spineshank
 Stencher
 Steve Vai (7-string guitars)
 Stone Sour (on "Get Inside")
 Sun Caged (7-string guitars)
 Textures (7 string guitars)
 Theory of a Deadman (on their song "No Surprise" and recent live performances of "Bad Girlfriend")
 The Project Hate MCMXCIX
 The Safety Fire (7-string guitars, drop A)
 To/Die/For
 Tremonti (on the title track of the album A Dying Machine, and on live performances of songs originally recorded in C tuning)
 Triptykon
 Trivium (7-string guitars, on some songs from The Crusade and all songs on Shogun)
 Type O Negative
 Unearth (7-string guitars)
 Universum
 Unleashed
 Vehemence
 Veil of Maya
 Visceral Bleeding
 Warning
 Whitechapel (7-string guitars, only on a few songs)
 Wicked Sisters
 Winterfylleth (also use Drop A)
 Within Temptation (lead guitarist Ruud Jolie uses 7-string guitars, while Robert Westerholt downtunes a six-string to B)
 Wormed
 Yanomamo

See also
List of guitar tunings
Guitar tuning
Dropped A

References

Guitar tunings